The IBM System/370 Model 148 (and the Model 138) were both announced June 30, 1976

Not only were they both more powerful and better in price/performance than their virtualized counterparts, but actually much lower in price

The 148 and 138, both of which were withdrawn November 1, 1983, were marketed as followups for those wishing to upgrade, respectively, their 370/145 and 370/135 systems.

Expanded capabilities
The 148 had four times the reloadable control storage of the 145, enabling or enhancing features such as:
 APL Assist
 Extended control program support'' - going beyond the language-specific APL Assist, this had wider scope, reducing CPU cycles needed to run the operating system.

A new model of the IBM 3203 printer family, the Model 4, was announced. Rated at 1200 Lines/Minutes, it was intended to provide already-available 1200 LPM printing, but in a more compact form.

Field upgrades
Sometimes known as in-the-field upgrades, this is a capability that even recently was not universal.

IBM could upgrade a 370/145 that had been field-upgraded to a 145-2, resulting in a 145-3. This was a major accomplishment, compared to what is known as a "forklift upgrade" out with the old, in with the new, often consuming valuable time.

Marketing considerations
An industry research firm said "may be described as early 380s programmed to act like 370s"

See also
 List of IBM products
 IBM System/360
 IBM System/370

References

IBM System/360 mainframe line
Computer-related introductions in 1976